Cyma Zarghami (born December 15, 1962) is an Iranian-born American film studio and former cable television executive who served as the president of Nickelodeon and Viacom Media Networks' Kids & Family Group from 2006 to 2018. She is the founder and CEO of MiMo Studios.

Early life
Zarghami was born in Abadan, Iran to an Iranian father, Gholam, and a Scottish mother, Catherine. The family later moved to Canada and finally to Englewood, New Jersey, where she graduated in the class of 1980 from the Dwight-Englewood School and was a recipient of the school's Distinguished Alumni Award. At Dwight-Englewood, she played lacrosse.

In 1980, Zarghami entered the University of Vermont in Burlington, Vermont as an elementary education major, later changing her major to English; she did not complete the degree. Zarghami was awarded an honorary diploma by the University of Vermont College of Education and Social Services in 2000.

Career
Zarghami traveled in Europe after leaving college, then returned to Burlington to work for Business Digest.

Zarghami joined Nickelodeon as a scheduling clerk in 1985. She moved up through the programming department and became the channel's general manager in 1996, overseeing programming, scheduling, acquisitions, marketing, and day-to-day management of the network. Zarghami was promoted to general manager and executive vice-president in 1997. In 2004, the position of president of Nickelodeon Television was created for Zarghami, where she oversaw production and development for the network, along with marketing, programming and creativity. After the resignation of Herb Scannell on January 5, 2006, Zarghami became president of the newly formed Kids & Family Group, which included Nickelodeon, Nick@Nite, Nick Jr., TeenNick, Nicktoons, TV Land, CMT, and CMT Pure Country. On June 4, 2018, Zarghami resigned as president of Nickelodeon following 33 years with the network.

In February 2020, she launched a production company and consultancy firm, MiMo Studios, to  develop original film properties of one hour or less in length for young audiences. MiMo is a portmanteau of "mini movie".

Personal life
Zarghami lives in New York City with her husband George Obergfoll, a stage manager, and their three sons. She formerly served on the board of the Children's Museum of Manhattan.

Filmography

Television

References

External links
MIPCOM Junior 2008 Keynote address
Cyma Zarghami biography on Nick.com

Living people
Nickelodeon executives
Women television executives
20th-century American businesswomen
People from Englewood, New Jersey
Iranian emigrants to the United States
Dwight-Englewood School alumni
University of Vermont alumni
American people of Scottish descent
1962 births
20th-century American businesspeople
21st-century American businesswomen
21st-century American businesspeople